Miliusa indica is a species of plant in the family Annonaceae, that is native to Western Ghats of India and Sri Lanka. The name is not given full validity.

References

India Biodiversity

indica